Wayne Perske (born 7 July 1974) is an Australian professional golfer.

Perske played on the PGA Tour of Australasia and the Japan Golf Tour, winning once.

In October 2010, Perske was arrested in Japan for cocaine possession. He was convicted and received an 18-month sentence in prison, suspended for three years.

Amateur wins
1998 Keperra Bowl
1999 Eastern Amateur
2000 Keperra Bowl

Professional wins (2)

Japan Golf Tour wins (1)

Australasian Development Tour wins (1)

Results in major championships

CUT = missed the halfway cut
Note: Perske only played in The Open Championship.

Team appearances
Amateur
Nomura Cup (representing Australia): 1999 (winners)
Australian Men's Interstate Teams Matches (representing Queensland): 1997, 1998, 1999

References

External links

Australian male golfers
PGA Tour of Australasia golfers
Japan Golf Tour golfers
Golfers from Brisbane
Sportsmen from Queensland
1974 births
Living people